Shopian or Shupiyan, known as Shupyan in Kashmiri, is an administrative division of the Shopian district, located in southern part of Kashmir Valley, of Jammu and Kashmir, India. Shopian is called the ''Apple town of Kashmir'' as majority of the population engages in apple growing practices which also provides employment to more than 60% of the population. It is 2nd richest district in Kashmir region after Srinagar.

General

The geologist Frederic Drew stated that Shopian derived its name from a distortion of word shah-payan, i.e. “royal stay”. However, the local people hold the view that Shopian was earlier named as “Shin-Van” meaning “snow forest”.

Shopian is an ancient town of Kashmir and had importance due to it being situated on the ancient imperial route, commonly known as Mughal Road, which connects Lahore and Srinagar. Shopian was one out of six Wazarat Headquarters in Kashmir from 1872 to 1892 A.D.

Geography 

Demographics 

 India census, Shopian Municipal Committee had a population of 16,360. There were 9,319 males (57%) and 7,041 females (43%). Of the population, 2,063 (12.6%) were age 0-6: 1,146 males (56%) and 917 females (44%).  The literacy rate for the people over six was 78.6% (males 86.7%, females 67.8%). The average population of the town was 6 persons each house.

Education
In 1988, The Government of Jammu and Kashmir established a college namely Government Degree College, Shopian which provides higher education infrastructure to the people of Shopian district. 
The Government Polytechnic college was established recently in the Shopian town, which provides technical engineering diploma level education.

Tourism
People from all around the globe visit the tourist places like Peer Ki Gali which is on a mountain top of Mughal road. Mughal Sarai - this palace is situated on the bank of river which flows on the side of Mughal road. This palace was used by Mughal rulers as their resting place during their travels.
Dabjan forests - this place is another tourist place of Shopian, where a spring is present in the middle of Dabjan forest. The Hirpora Wildlife Sanctuary is an abode to many species of animals including the Himalayan brown bear, Himalayan black bear, musk deer, leopard, Tibetan wolf, Himalayan palm civet  and also critically endangered Pir Panjal markhor. Besides, 130 species of birds including the spotted forktail, western tragopan, rock bunting, rufous-breasted accentor, Himalayan woodpecker, blue rock thrush, white-capped redstart, Himalayan griffon, common stonechat and grey wagtail are found in the Sanctuary.

Economy
Majority of the population are apple fruit growers.

See also
Mughal Road
Aharbal
Hirpora Wildlife Sanctuary
Kulgam
Anantnag

References

External links
 
 

Cities and towns in Shopian district